Oak Center is an unincorporated community located in the town of Oakfield, Fond du Lac County, Wisconsin, United States.

Oak Center was named for a grove of oak trees near the original town site.

Notes

Unincorporated communities in Fond du Lac County, Wisconsin
Unincorporated communities in Wisconsin